HFD may refer to:

Transportation 
 Hafizabad railway station, Punjab, Pakistan, station code
 Hartford-Brainard Airport, Connecticut, US, IATA code
 Hereford railway station, England, station code
 Hoofddorp railway station, Netherlands, station code
 Union Station (Hartford), Connecticut, US, Amtrak code

Fire departments 
 Henderson Fire Department, Nevada, US
 Honolulu Fire Department, Hawaii, US
 Houston Fire Department, Texas, US
 Hoboken Fire Department, New Jersey, US

Other uses 
 DHS Human Factors and Behavioral Sciences Division
 Half-factorial domain, an atomic domain
 Halfords, UK retailer, LSE code
 Hardware Freedom Day